The red-mantled saddle-back tamarin (Leontocebus lagonotus) is a species of saddle-back tamarin, a type of small monkey from South America.  The red-mantled saddle-back tamarin was formerly considered to be a subspecies of the brown-mantled tamarin, L. fuscicollis.  It lives in Ecuador and Peru and its type locality is in Peru, near the confluence of the Amazon River and the Napo River.

The IUCN rates it as least concern from a conservation standpoint.

References

Leontocebus
Taxa named by Marcos Jiménez de la Espada
Mammals described in 1870